Caroline Lesley is an American-Canadian actor and singer.

She had a role in the movie Fruitvale Station which won the Grand Jury and Audience Awards at Sundance Film Festival, and the Future Award at Cannes Film Festival.

Lesley's recent work includes roles on FX on Hulu series Y: The Last Man (TV series), Amazon Studios series The Boys, National Geographic Channel show Air Crash Investigation (TV series), Metro-Goldwyn-Mayer show Condor (TV series), Ion Television series Private Eyes (TV series).

Lesley performed at the Upright Citizens Brigade Theatre (UCB) in New York City, and The Groundlings in Los Angeles.

Lesley guest-starred on the satire TV series The Onion News Network on Independent Film Channel.

Her one-woman show, Doppelganger Joe, premiered at the New York International Fringe Festival.

Lesley co-created Periscope's first TV Channel, Parachute TV. Parachute TV won the Digital Entertainment World startup award.

Early life
Caroline attended the Ryerson Theatre School in Toronto, where she received her BFA with honors.

She played Queen Isabella in her graduate production of Richard II directed by John Neville.

Career

Early career

She was a guest host on Toronto's urban FLOW 93.5 radio (where she was also a copywriter) and she lent her voice to numerous radio and TV commercials.

Lesley continued her work in theater and performed improv shows in Ontario with the Canadian Improv Showcase.

She also appeared in shows at the Summerworks Festival in Toronto and the Toronto Fringe Festival.

She starred in 13 episodes of Rogers Cable improv show The Canadian Improv Showcase.

She performed in the play In Between at the Centre for the Arts in Toronto. Caroline received rave reviews for her role as Wendy, a neurotic misfit, trying to find her place.

She guest-starred on Soul Food on Showtime and BET.

She also appeared in a number of short films and TV commercials, including Bud Light, Bell Canada, and TJ Maxx.

Hosting work
In 2004, Lesley was a host on the Canadian Broadcasting Corporation television series The X.

Lesley was a red carpet correspondent for Entertainment Weekly.

She performed one-on-one celebrity sit-down interviews and covered red carpets for EW parties, film festivals (including Sundance and Toronto International Film Festival) and Emmy and Oscar events.

Caroline was the official periscope live-streaming red carpet Daytime Emmy host for the 2016 Daytime Emmy Awards.

Lesley covered the red carpet for the opening of Billy Elliot on Broadway and appeared in the Finding Billy documentary produced by Universal Pictures with Elton John.

She also covered the Tony Awards.

She hosted several YouTube shows called "Simple Do's and Don'ts", "The Captain Humphrey's Project", and created the comedic mom show "Eating My Cake Too."

She created a weekly show on Parachute TV called "Puppet's Place" that she hosted and voiced the puppet.

Voice work

Lesley was the voice of Yoplait and is the voice of the little boy Kam Kamazaki on Medabots, an anime television series. She is the voice of Lidda on the Dungeons and Dragons movie: Scourge of Worlds.

Caroline was also the sultry intermission voice on early episodes of The Starters when it was known as the Basketball Jones podcast.

Other work

Caroline filmed a television pilot with Eddie Steeples in Los Angeles.

Lesley did several episodes of the CBS daytime soap opera As the World Turns

She starred in the indie film: Sister Blister in New York City and jumped out of a plane for the role.

Lesley appeared in a TV commercial for Anderson Cooper's daytime talk show: Anderson.

She wrote, produced, and directed her own short film, Audio Guide, which screened at the NYC Downtown Short Film Festival and the Long Island International Film Festival.

She has several sketch comedy videos on Funny or Die and appeared in sketches for Details.com and EW.com.

Lesley was the face of Farmland Dairies milk ad seen in Shape and on billboards across New York City and New Jersey.

She released a single called The Rainbow.

Filmography

References

External links
 Official site of Caroline Lesley
 
 

Canadian television actresses
Canadian voice actresses
Living people
Year of birth missing (living people)